Paul Millett (born 1954) is a British classicist and academic. He is a senior lecturer in Classics at the University of Cambridge and a fellow of Downing College, Cambridge. At Downing, Millett is the Director of Studies for Classics  and serves as Admissions Tutor for arts subjects.

He studied at Cambridge University, with Moses I. Finley as his adviser.

Millett's research primarily focuses on ancient economics and the human interrelationships that subsequently take place in ancient Greece.

Publications
 Aristotle and Athenian slavery, (2007) Greece and Rome.
 The Trial of Socrates Revisited, European Review of History 12 (2005) 23-62.
 The Economy in Ancient Greece (ed. R. Osborne), Vol.I of The Shorter Oxford History of Europe 23-51 (2000) Oxford.
 Lending and Borrowing in Ancient Athens (1991) Cambridge.
 Nomos: Essays in Athenian Law, Politics and Society, contains: ‘Law, society and Athens’ (with S. Todd) 1-18; ‘Sale, credit and exchange in Athenian law and society’ 167-94 (1990) Cambridge.
 Kosmos: Studies in Interpersonal Relations in Ancient Greece, containing chapter ‘Encounters in the Agora’ 203-28 (1988) Cambridge.

References

External links
 Millett's profile at Downing College
 Millett's profile at the University of Cambridge Faculty of Classics

Fellows of Downing College, Cambridge
1954 births
Living people
Alumni of the University of Cambridge
English classical scholars
English male writers